Surrogate advertising is a form of advertising which is used to promote regulated products, like cigarettes and alcohol, in the disguise of another product. This type of advertising uses a product of a fairly close category, as: club soda, mineral water in case of alcohol, or products of a completely different category (for example, music CDs or playing cards) to hammer the brand name into the heads of consumers. The banned product (alcohol or cigarettes) may not be projected directly to consumers but rather masked under another product under the same brand name, so that whenever there is mention of that brand, people start associating it with its main product (the alcohol or cigarette). In India there is a large number of companies doing surrogate advertising, from Bacardi Blast music CD's, Bagpiper Club Soda to Officers Choice playing cards.

History
The origin of surrogate advertising can be traced to Britain, where housewives started protesting against liquor advertisements which provoked their husbands. The protest rose to a level where liquor advertising had to be banned and brand owners seeing no way out decided to promote fruit juices and soda under the brand name; the concept later emerged as surrogate advertisements.

Surrogate advertising in India 
India has held a strong stance on the ban of advertising tobacco and liquor products since 1995. The ban was enforced after extensive research from the Indian Ministry of Health found that cigarettes and liquor have adverse effects on a person's health. In addition to this, the Indian government holds the notion that these products are especially harmful to a person's mental health, making them lazy and unmotivated. The combination of these factors lead to an eventual ban on advertising of these products throughout its media channels.

However, the negative outlook on advertising these products can be traced back to 1975, when the Indian government introduced the Cigarette advertising act, forcing tobacco companies to display health warnings on the packaging and advertisements for cigarettes. The Indian government and health ministry continued to push for stronger restriction of the advertising of tobacco and liquor until its eventual complete ban in 1995. However, the increase in population saw the sales of tobacco and liquor increase at an exponential rate. Therefore, companies were forced to seek alternative means of advertising, which lead the eventual creation of surrogate advertising in India.

Some of the first evidence of surrogate advertising was seen by the Indian tobacco Company ‘Azad Bidi, who sponsored an international cricket match in India. In India, extensive surveys resulted in similar findings which showed that liquor ads had direct influence on consumers' purchasing behavior. Soon afterwards, the Cable TV Regulation Act banned liquor and cigarette advertisements; thus, India gradually adopted surrogate advertisements.

Such companies usually either go for brand extension and promote the extended products, or promote certain products which might not be available in the market. The excessive pressure of the ban forced companies to focus more on brand building and thus liquor companies started sponsoring and hosting glamorous events, yet many others started distributing t-shirts, caps, key chains, drinking glasses with the brand name displayed on these products.

Surrogate advertising mandates a requirement for the product being marketed to have a revenue model associated with it.
On 7 October 2022, consumer affairs ministry of India issued notices to 6 alcohol and tobacco brands due to their surrogate advertising.  Central Consumer Protection Authority (CCPA) has sent notices to Premium Black, Sterling Reserve, Seagram's Imperial Blue, Vimal Pan Masala, Rajnigandha Pan Masala and Kamala Pasand Pan Masala and told them to give answers on violating advertising guidelines. CCPA also asked them to discontinue these ads with immediate effect.

Many Betting websites, mobile apps do surrogate advertising in India. For example, they open similar name websites as apps to advertise their main betting company. Some examples include 1xBet running 1XNews, 1XBat, extensively advertised as sporting blog and sportswear brand respectively. 1xBet signed Indian former cricketer Yuvraj Singh as their brand ambassador. Fair Play, Betway also use similar type of tactic, to attract people to their main betting app, website. They are using national TV channels such as Star Sports etc. and YouTube channels, online media for advertising. But due to weak Indian laws these illegal betting apps are running and advertising in India.

Effectiveness of surrogate advertisements
According to the inferences drawn from several surveys and interviews, 42 out of 50 people can understand the actual liquor or tobacco product being advertised.

Surrogate advertisements do impact a consumer's buying decision as well. They also inform consumers about the leading liquor brands and thus promote sales.

Current scenario
With government now enforcing ban on surrogate advertisements, companies are turning to event sponsorship, event organising, corporate films and more and more innovative integrated marketing communications strategies, though surrogate advertising is still a common practice.

Brand extensions, which is the expansion of a company towards products it did not sell previously, are allowed and somewhat common. The main difference between this practice and surrogate advertising is that surrogate advertising does not want to sell the supposed new product and it actually wants to promote a product whose advertising is prohibited.

See also 

 Fraud in India - List of articles related to fraud in India
 Fraud 
 Internet fraud
 Misleading advertisement 
 False advertising 
 List of Commercial crimes articles
 Deception

References

External links

Banning Liquor Surrogate Advertising

Advertising techniques